There are 16 extant historical elevators in the city of Valparaíso in Chile.
Technically most of these elevators are bona fide funiculars. Only one of them, the Ascensor Polanco, is a true vertical elevator. They were mainly constructed in the late 19th and early 20th centuries.

Description

Valparaíso in Chile, due to the number of hills above the so-called plan has had up to 30 ascensores. 
Only 16 of them remained extant today and they are declared National Monuments of Chile.  only 7 of elevators are in operation, the other 9 are under a process of restoration and modernisation.

These extant ascensores are a part of the Historic Quarter of the Seaport City of Valparaíso site which since 2003 is included into the UNESCO's World Heritage List.

Below is a list of known elevators (funiculars and the lift) in Valparaiso.

Further reading

See also 
 Trolleybuses in Valparaíso
 Valparaíso Metro

Notes

External links 

 Bruse's Funiculars.net
 ascensoresvalparaiso.org

Valparaiso
Valparaíso
National Monuments of Chile
Transport in Valparaíso Region